Cristóvão da Silva Ramos (born 25 March 1983), known simply as Cristóvão, is a former Portuguese footballer who played as a right winger.

Club career
Cristóvão was born in Lyon, France. After playing youth football with FC Porto he made his senior debuts with the B-team in the third division, going on to spend four years with them in that tier. Released in the summer of 2005 without one single official appearance for the main squad, he joined Primeira Liga club F.C. Penafiel, but left after a couple of months and moved to Leixões S.C. in the second level, where he appeared very rarely over the course of two (incomplete) seasons.

In late December 2007, Cristovão signed with AEP Paphos FC from Cyprus. In the 2009 off-season he joined fellow First Division team Anorthosis Famagusta FC, making his league debut on 30 August in a 0–0 away draw against Ermis Aradippou.

On 3 February 2012, Cristóvão moved to Bulgaria with PFC Levski Sofia, signing a two-and-a-half-year contract. He scored on his first First Professional Football League appearance, helping his team to a 2–1 win over PFC Cherno More Varna; on 29 April 2012, he netted the only goal in a derby success against PFC CSKA Sofia.

Cristóvão was released by Levski in summer 2013 (alongside some of the other foreign players) mainly due to his high salary, but he returned to the club after the winter break.

Club statistics

References

External links

Levski official profile

1983 births
Living people
French people of Portuguese descent
Citizens of Portugal through descent
Footballers from Lyon
Portuguese footballers
Association football wingers
Primeira Liga players
Liga Portugal 2 players
Segunda Divisão players
FC Porto B players
F.C. Penafiel players
Leixões S.C. players
Cypriot First Division players
Cypriot Second Division players
AEP Paphos FC players
Anorthosis Famagusta F.C. players
AC Omonia players
First Professional Football League (Bulgaria) players
PFC Levski Sofia players
Konyaspor footballers
Portugal youth international footballers
Portugal under-21 international footballers
Portuguese expatriate footballers
Expatriate footballers in Cyprus
Expatriate footballers in Bulgaria
Expatriate footballers in Turkey
Portuguese expatriate sportspeople in Cyprus
Portuguese expatriate sportspeople in Bulgaria